Tom Gilbey may refer to:
 Tom Gilbey (footballer)
 Tom Gilbey (designer)